Ronaldson is a surname. Notable people with the surname include:

Duncan Ronaldson (1879–1947), Scottish football player
James Ronaldson (1769–1841), co-founder of Binny & Ronaldson
John Ronaldson (born 1946), Australian football player
Malcolm Ronaldson (1917–2004), South African cricketer
Michael Ronaldson (born 1954), Australian politician
Tony Ronaldson (born 1972), Australian basketball player